Clypeaster, common name "cake urchins" or "sea biscuits", is a genus  of echinoderms belonging to the family Clypeasteridae.

Etymology
The genus name Clypeaster is derived from the Latin “clypeus” (meaning round shield) and “aster” (meaning star), with reference to the shape of these organisms.

List of species
 Clypeaster aloysioi (Brito, 1959)
 Clypeaster amplificatus Koehler, 1922
 Clypeaster annandalei Koehler, 1922
 Clypeaster australasiae (Gray, 1851)
 Clypeaster chesheri Serafy, 1970
 Clypeaster cyclopilus H.L. Clark, 1941
 Clypeaster durandi (Cherbonnier, 1959b)
 Clypeaster elongatus H.L. Clark, 1948
 Clypeaster euclastus H.L. Clark, 1941
 Clypeaster europacificus H.L. Clark, 1914
 Clypeaster eurychorius H.L. Clark, 1924
 Clypeaster euryptealus H.L. Clark, 1925
 Clypeaster fervens Koehler, 1922
 Clypeaster humilis (Leske, 1778)
 Clypeaster isolatus Serafy, 1971
 Clypeaster japonicus Döderlein, 1885
 Clypeaster kieri Pawson & Phelan, 1979
 Clypeaster lamprus H.L. Clark, 1914
 Clypeaster latissimus (Lamarck, 1816)
 Clypeaster leptostracon A. Agassiz & H.L. Clark, 1907
 Clypeaster luetkeni Mortensen, 1948
 Clypeaster lytopetalus A. Agassiz & H.L. Clark, 1907
 Clypeaster microstomus Lambert, 1912 †
 Clypeaster miniaceus H.L. Clark, 1925
 Clypeaster minihagali Deraniyagala, 1956 †
 Clypeaster nummus Mortensen, 1948
 Clypeaster ochrus H.L. Clark, 1914
 Clypeaster ohshimensis Ikeda, 1935
 Clypeaster oliveirai Krau, 1952
 Clypeaster pallidus H.L. Clark, 1914
 Clypeaster pateriformis Mortensen, 1948
 Clypeaster prostratus (Ravenel, 1845)
 Clypeaster rangianus Desmoulins, 1835
 Clypeaster rarispinus de Meijere, 1903
 Clypeaster ravenelii (A. Agassiz, 1869)
 Clypeaster reticulatus (Linnaeus, 1758)
 Clypeaster rosaceus (Linnaeus, 1758)
 Clypeaster rotundus (A. Agassiz, 1863)
 Clypeaster speciosus Verrill, 1870
 Clypeaster subdepressus (Gray, 1825)
 Clypeaster telurus H.L. Clark, 1914
 Clypeaster tumidus (Tension-Woods, 1878)
 Clypeaster virescens Döderlein, 1885

Gallery

References

 Clypeaster  Lamarck, 1801
 Animal Diversity
 National History Museum
Sepkoski, Jack Sepkoski's Online Genus Database
 Paleobiology Database

 
Clypeasteridae
Echinoidea genera
Extant Eocene first appearances
Taxa named by Jean-Baptiste Lamarck